Thomas de Roxas Acevedo (1626-1668) was a Spanish politician and military man, who served as member of the city council as alcalde and regidor of Buenos Aires.

Biography 

He was born in Buenos Aires, the son of Pedro de Roxas y Acevedo and María de Vega, born in Santiago del Estero. After completing his elementary studies, he served in the militia, reaching the Captain degree of the Presidio de Buenos Aires. 

He was appointed as Síndico Procurador General of the city in 1648, and was elect as alcalde of 2nd vote of Buenos Aires in 1654. He also served alférez real, mayordomo and regidor of the Cabildo of Buenos Aires. 

Thomas de Roxas y Acevedo was involved in illegal trade in the Río de la Plata.  His grandfather Diego de Vega, was a known smuggler, who served as banker of Buenos Aires towards the beginning of the 17th century.

References

External links 
Una Residencia Suntuosa

1626 births
1668 deaths
Mayors of Buenos Aires
Spanish colonial governors and administrators
People from Buenos Aires